Talal Alkernawi (other spellings: Talal Alkrinawi or Talal Al karnawi) is an Arab-Muslim Israeli politician. He served as the mayor of Rahat in three spells between 1993 and 2018.

Early life 
He was born (1954) and raised in Rahat.

Career 

Alkernawi started his career in a local bank. He was quickly promoted and became a bank manager at the age of 25. He served as a bank manager for a few years and then went on to politics.

In 1977, he joined the Israeli Labor Party.

In 1989, he ran for office in the city of Rahat. He was not elected, although he became the deputy mayor. In 1993, he was elected for the first time as the Mayor of Rahat. In his first period of office, Rahat's status was changed from a small local municipality to a city.

In 1994, he participated in the Oslo accords, and was Yitzhak Rabins advisor as an Arabic-speaking politician.

Mayoralty

City size & land 
During his tenure in Office for the years of 2013-2018, the city grew by 21,000 dunam which meant it doubled its size. This was done by an agreement with a municipality near by to pass land in order for Rahat to grow.

Economy 
The unemployment rate went down from 34% in 2013 to 11% in 2018. Thanks to founding Idan HaNegev and recruiting SodaStream to bring their factory to Rahat and employ over 2,500 employees.

Tax collection 
In 2006, Rahat was able to collect municipality taxes from only 59% of its residents. In 2018, the local municipality collected local tax from 90% of its residents which helped grow its income and budget.

Culture 
Built the first country club (swimming pool and recreational center) in rahat.

Education 
In terms of education, when he took office in 2013 only 40% of Rahats students finished school with matriculation examination certificate. In 2018, 56% finished with a matriculation examination certificate. In addition, in 2013, only 0.7% of the school students finished with the highest level of English certificate. In 2018, the percentage grew to 8.4%.

Tourism 
In 2015, the municipality cooperating with government ministries started to develop tourists trips in Rahat.

Personal life 
Alkernawi lives in Rahat, is married and has six children. He is the brother of Prof. Alean Al Krenawi.

Political views 
Alkernawi is known to express his views supporting coexistence living between Arabs and Jews in Israel. He was a member of two different center-left wing parties (Kadima and Labor party).

In 2017, he publicly offered to absorb Syrian refugees to Rahat, and offered them work in the city.

References

External links 

 Rahat’s Week From Hell
 Police Visit Negev Beduin Leaders To Mark Eid Al-Adha

Year of birth missing (living people)
Living people
Arab politicians in Israel
Mayors of places in Israel
Bedouin Israelis
People from Southern District (Israel)
Arab citizens of Israel
People from Rahat
Ono Academic College alumni